Billy Ray Waldon (born January 3, 1952), also known as Billy Joe Waldon or Nvwtohiyada Idehesdi Sequoyah (Cherokee: ᏅᏙᎯᏯᏓ ᎢᏕᎮᏍᏗ ᏎᏉᏯ, Nvdohiyada Idehesdi Sequoya), is an American criminal, former fugitive, Native American Movement activist, and Esperantist who in 1986, became the 399th fugitive listed by the FBI on the Ten Most Wanted Fugitives List. Waldon murdered three people during a crime spree in 1985. 

A native of Oklahoma, Waldon was apprehended on June 16, 1986 after San Diego, California police attempted to pull him over for a routine traffic citation. In 1992, Waldon was convicted of three counts of murder and sentenced to death in California. In 2023, Waldon's convictions were overturned by the California Supreme Court on grounds that he was denied representation by competent counsel.

Criminal history

Crimes
Waldon's crime spree began in Tulsa, Oklahoma on October 10, 1985, when he wounded a man during a robbery. On November 15, Waldon shot a 28-year-old woman in the head. However, the bullet grazed her skull and she survived. Two days later, on November 17, a woman was robbed at gunpoint and shot by Waldon. The woman died of her injuries two days later. Waldon was not charged or tried for this killing. On November 23, Waldon shot and wounded two people who were getting out of their car. 

Two weeks later, Waldon broke into the San Diego, California home of 43-year-old Dawn Ellerman and shot her in the neck, killing her. Ellerman's 13-year-old daughter died of smoke inhalation while trying to rescue her mother from the house, which Waldon had set on fire during his escape. On December 19, Waldon was spotted fleeing a robbery in his car by police, who soon gave chase. Waldon managed to evade the police and abandoned the car, soon after running to the residence of 59-year-old Gordon Wells, who Waldon shot and killed. Later, Waldon shot and wounded Wells' neighbor and stole his car, which was found abandoned in late January 1986. A ballistics test linked Waldon's San Diego crimes to his Oklahoma crimes, and a federal arrest warrant was issued soon after.

Manhunt and Capture
The federal arrest warrant charged Waldon with unlawful interstate flight to avoid prosecution for murder, attempted murder, robbery, burglary, rape and arson. According to the FBI, Waldon had held a variety of different jobs and had served in the U.S. Navy for ten years, where he had been trained in deep sea diving. Waldon was additionally noted to speak and understand several different languages, including French, Italian, Japanese, Spanish, and Esperanto. Waldon was reported to be one-fourth Cherokee Indian and to have an interest in Cherokee history and culture.

On April 23, 1986, Waldon became the 399th fugitive to be listed on the FBI's Ten Most Wanted Fugitive's list. In June 1986, Daniel Roman discovered that his 1965 Mustang was missing. Later that day, a driver in a car matching the description of Roman’s attempted to speed away from police and fled on foot when they tried to stop him for a broken tail light. Police apprehended and arrested the man, who gave his name as “Stephen Midas” but was later identified as Waldon.

Legal Proceedings

Trial and sentencing
Waldon was judged competent to stand trial for the crimes and his trial began in 1991. Waldon wished to represent himself in court, but a judge denied this motion, stating that Waldon could not understaned the risks of self-representation. However though, a second judge granted his request to represent himself. During his trial, Waldon alleged that he had been beaten by federal agents and framed for the crimes over his 'promotion of Indian autonomy'. Waldon additionally claimed that during his fugitive state, he had hid in the crawlspace of a house in Imperial Beach, fearing that he would be convicted anyway if he plead innocent. Waldon was convicted of three counts of first degree murder, as well as multiple counts of attempted murder, rape, burglary, robbery, and animal cruelty in December 1991 and was sentenced to death in February 1992.

Conviction overturned
On January 23, 2023, Waldon's murder convictions and death sentences were overturned on grounds of courtroom behavior, his 'delusional' self-representation and a trial court judge's decision that had improperly allowed him to represent himself "without considering (the other judge's) denial or the evidence on which it was based" had deprived him of competent legal representation. The California State supreme court granted Waldon a new trial.

Poliespo

Poliespo ("Polysynthetic Esperanto", also Po) is an international auxiliary language created by Waldon.

Waldon ran a "World Poliespo Organization" for enthusiasts of the language.

Goals

The principle of creation for Poliespo was Waldon's belief that certain languages contain words that made communication quicker, which he referred to as "lightning bolts" or "lightning words", and the goal was to combine as many of these as possible into one language. The language was originally referred to as "Anagalisgi," the romanized form of Cherokee word for lightning. Most of Poliespo comes from Cherokee, English, Esperanto, and Spanish, the languages that Waldon could speak.

The philosophy behind the language is reminiscent of sound symbolism, and therefore radically differs from the principles of Esperanto.

Waldon also claimed that learning Poliespo is a golden opportunity to acquire an "Iroquoian spirit." In his words, "When one gains a new language, one gains a new soul. Po is your golden chance to acquire an Iroquoian spirit."

Phonology 
Poliespo is believed to have 32 consonants, including the glottal stop, in addition to 22 vowels: 10 oral vowels (two of which are distinguished by vowel length) and nine nasal vowels, one of which is distinguished by vowel length. Poliespo is also a tonal language, having three or four tones. The rising tone is the only tone that is marked, using an acute accent.

Orthography
Poliespo's alphabet consists of 54 letters: a, â, ⱥ, ⱥ̂, b, b̆, c, ĉ, d, e, ê, f, g, ĝ, h, ĥ, i, ĭ, ĭ:, ĭ́, î, î:, î́, j, ĵ, k, k̆, l, m, m̆, n, n̆, o, ô, p, pw  , s, ŝ, t, t̂, tͮ, u, û, ŭ, v, z, ẑ, z̆, q, q́, q̂, q̂́, w, ẃ, ŵ, ŵ́, x, x́, y, 2, 2́. In addition, the consonant ẑ represents , while the consonant z̆ represents . pw   is p overstruck with w, and tͮ is t overstruck with v.

Grammar

The structure is more similar to Ido than to Esperanto, since radicals are inflected. Unlike Ido, Poliespo has only one prefix in addition to those of Esperanto: , which is used to indicate the "neuter" gender. Besides the accusative case, there is also a subject suffix, as in Korean and Japanese. In Poliespo, there are two forms of oral speech. If one does not understand what someone says in Poliespo (referred to as ), they should repeat themselves in Esperanto (referred to as ).

{| style="border: 1px solid black;"
|banant̂ⱥn2plaĉqlx!
|-
|banana-PL.SING-like-DAT-HAB
|-
|colspan=9 align="center"|"I don't like bananas!"
|}

See also
 FBI Ten Most Wanted Fugitives, 1980s
 List of death row inmates in the United States

References

External links
 Nvwtohiyada Idehesdi Sequoyah – Stories, documents, photos from family and friends
 Sequoyah condemned to death (French)
 The "serial murderer" Billy Waldon
 Pli kaj pli malfacila la situacio de Sequoyah (el Heroldo Komunikas) (Esperanto)

1952 births
Constructed language creators
American Esperantists
American people convicted of murder
American prisoners sentenced to death
American spree killers
FBI Ten Most Wanted Fugitives
Living people
Native American activists
People convicted of murder by California
American rapists
People from Tahlequah, Oklahoma
Prisoners sentenced to death by California